Ben Moon (born 14 July 1989) is an English Rugby Union player for Premiership side Exeter Chiefs. He also represents England. His position of choice is loosehead prop. He has represented England U16 and England U18. He has represented the side many times in the Aviva Premiership, Champions Cup, LV Cup and the Championship.

Club career 
Moon made his debut for Exeter on 4 October 2008 against Sedgley Park. He started the final as Exeter Chiefs defeated Wasps to be crowned champions of the 2016-17 English Premiership.

International career
In September 2018 Moon was invited to a training camp with the senior England squad by Eddie Jones after a number of injury withdrawals. Moon made his international debut coming on as a second half replacement for Alec Hepburn in the Autumn International game against South Africa.

References

External links
 Exeter Player Profile

Living people
1989 births
Exeter Chiefs players
Rugby union players from Tiverton, Devon
England international rugby union players
Rugby union props